Ponapagonum is a genus of beetles in the family Carabidae, containing the following species:

 Ponapagonum dybasi Darlington, 1970
 Ponapagonum pairoti Darlington, 1970

References

Platyninae